Kranzburg is a town in Codington County, South Dakota, United States. The population was 163 at the 2020 census. It is part of the Watertown, South Dakota Micropolitan Statistical Area.

History
Kranzburg was platted in 1879. It was named in honor of the four Kranz brothers who settled there. A post office has been in operation in Kranzburg since 1879.

Geography
Kranzburg is located at  (44.890597, -96.916470).

Kranzburg has been assigned the ZIP code 57245 and the FIPS place code 34340.

Demographics

2010 census
As of the census of 2010, there were 172 people, 64 households, and 49 families residing in the town. The racial makeup of the town was 99.4% White and 0.6% from other races. Hispanic or Latino of any race were 0.6% of the population.

There were 64 households, of which 31.3% had children under the age of 18 living with them, 70.3% were married couples living together, 3.1% had a female householder with no husband present, 3.1% had a male householder with no wife present, and 23.4% were non-families. 17.2% of all households were made up of individuals, and 12.5% had someone living alone who was 65 years of age or older. The average household size was 2.69 and the average family size was 3.12.

The median age in the town was 39.5 years. 25% of residents were under the age of 18; 6.5% were between the ages of 18 and 24; 26.2% were from 25 to 44; 26.8% were from 45 to 64; and 15.7% were 65 years of age or older. The gender makeup of the town was 51.2% male and 48.8% female.

2000 census
As of the census of 2000, there were 185 people, 63 households, and 48 families residing in the town. The population density was 242.9 people per square mile (94.0/km2). There were 65 housing units at an average density of 85.4 per square mile (33.0/km2). The racial makeup of the town was 98.38% White, 0.54% African American, 0.54% Native American, 0.54% from other races. Hispanic or Latino of any race were 1.08% of the population.

There were 63 households, out of which 49.2% had children under the age of 18 living with them, 61.9% were married couples living together, 7.9% had a female householder with no husband present, and 23.8% were non-families. 22.2% of all households were made up of individuals, and 6.3% had someone living alone who was 65 years of age or older. The average household size was 2.94 and the average family size was 3.48.

In the town, the population was spread out, with 37.8% under the age of 18, 6.5% from 18 to 24, 29.7% from 25 to 44, 16.2% from 45 to 64, and 9.7% who were 65 years of age or older. The median age was 29 years. For every 100 females, there were 107.9 males. For every 100 females age 18 and over, there were 91.7 males.

The median income for a household in the town was $45,125, and the median income for a family was $46,406. Males had a median income of $30,125 versus $21,250 for females. The per capita income for the town was $13,258. About 6.7% of families and 15.1% of the population were below the poverty line, including 21.5% of those under the age of eighteen and none of those 65 or over.

Points of interest
The Kranzburg post office is located on Dakota Avenue, and is co-located with First Premier Bank, providing mail delivery and financial services to the area.

The Kranzburg Ball Diamond hosts t-ball, baseball, and softball games throughout the summer as part of the youth recreation program in Kranzburg.

Holy Rosary Catholic Church is a historic Catholic Church located on Minnesota Avenue on the north side of the village. As of January 2023, Mass times are available every week. 

Holy Rosary Cemetery is located a half block north from the church, surrounded by fields. The pine trees planted throughout the cemetery form the shape of a cross, when viewed from the air. Historic rock sculptures and Stations of the Cross are also located on the north end of the cemetery, dating back to the 1940s.

The Kranzburg School, the first public schoolhouse in Codington County, is located on St. Peter Street.

The Kranzburg co-op elevator was used until the mid-1990s, before being sold for private use. In the summer of 2013, the dilapidated structure was torn down, and the former site is currently vacant.

Jeffrey's Supperclub and Lounge has been in operation since 1994, and is located across from the post office and bank. Well known to locals in the area for its great food and comfortable dining atmosphere, the restaurant boasts a salad bar and dinner specials every week, from chicken and shrimp, to prime rib and filet mignon. There is also a full size bar located in the front of the building, with beer and liquor available on tap and for purchase. A private room is also available for large gatherings.

The Tip Top Tavern is located 1/4 mile southwest of Kranzburg, alongside US Highway 212. The former building dated back to 1904 and was in need of numerous repairs by the time the decision to build came. The current building was constructed in 2011, with a convenience store taking over the north end of the building, and the bar and diner located on the south end. Four gas pumps are also located on the east side of the building. The bar offers beer on tap and many alcoholic beverages for sale. Marge's Diner offers several pub favorites, as well as appetizers, ranging from chislic and onion rings to chicken sandwiches and pizza.

Education
Holy Rosary Catholic School was the only school in operation in Kranzburg, until closing its doors in 2013. The private grade school served the Kranzburg community and surrounding area for over 70 years, with preschool, kindergarten, and first through sixth grades offered to students. The building is still currently in use, with religious education classes taking place every week during the regular school year. The attached parish hall is also used for private and parish sponsored events, from dinners to the annual bazaar every September. A new playground was installed on the grounds in 2007 as well.

Arts and culture
Kranzburg is the annual host of the Kranzburg Fourth of July parade, where visitors have come from far and wide to celebrate the 4th of July for over 60 years. The small town of 172 people boasts a staggering number of over 10,000 people every year, with distinguished visitors participating in the parade, such as U.S. Senator John Thune and Governor Kristi Noem.

Transportation
U.S. Route 212 runs east to west on the south end of Kranzburg, with Minneapolis/St. Paul being three and a half hours to the east, and the city of Watertown eight miles to the west. Access to Interstate 29 is also located eight miles to the west and 12 miles to the south.

Watertown Regional Airport is located 14 miles to the west of Kranzburg, providing daily air service to Chicago and Denver.

References

Towns in Codington County, South Dakota
Towns in South Dakota
Watertown, South Dakota micropolitan area
Populated places established in 1878